Darkhvor-e Hasanabad (also Romanized as Dārkhvor-e Ḩasanābād; also known as Dārkhor-e Ḩasanābād) is a village in Hasanabad Rural District, in the Central District of Eslamabad-e Gharb County, Kermanshah Province, Iran. At the 2006 census, its population was 232, in 52 families.

References 

Populated places in Eslamabad-e Gharb County